Parker's Piece is a  flat and roughly square green common located near the centre of Cambridge, England, regarded by some as the birthplace of the rules of association football. The two main walking and cycling paths across it run diagonally, and the single lamp-post at the junction is colloquially known as Reality Checkpoint. The area is bounded by Park Terrace, Parkside, Gonville Place, and Regent Terrace. The Cambridge University Football Club Laws were first used on Parker's Piece and adopted by the Football Association in 1863. "They embrace the true principles of the game, with the greatest simplicity" (E. C. Morley, F.A. Hon. Sec. 1863). 'The Cambridge Rules appear to be the most desirable for the Association to adopt' (C. W. Alcock 1863, FA committee member and founder of the FA Cup).

The grass is mown and the area is known today chiefly as a spot for picnics and games of football and cricket, and serves as the games field for nearby Parkside Community College.  Fairs tend to be held on the rougher ground of Midsummer Common. Daytime events and concerts are occasionally held on the Regent's Terrace side of Parker's Piece, while north-western quarter is still maintained as a venue for league cricket.

In 1838, a feast for 15,000 guests was held on Parker's Piece to celebrate the coronation of Queen Victoria. There is a blue plaque dedicated to Jack Hobbs on the wall of the building known locally as Hobbs Pavilion.

History

Before 1613, Parker's Piece was owned by Trinity College. In that year, the college exchanged it with the town of Cambridge for Garrett Hostel Green, a site east of the River Cam where the Wren Library of Trinity College now stands. Parker's Piece takes its name from Edward Parker, a Trinity College cook who had leased the land from the college since 1587.

As a cricket ground, Parker's Piece was used for first-class matches from 1817 to 1864.

In the 19th century, it was one of the principal sports grounds used by students at the University of Cambridge and the site of numerous Varsity Matches against Oxford.

Parker's Piece and football

In the 19th century, football was also commonly played on this ground, as is described in the following quotation from George Corrie, Master of Jesus College (1838):  "In walking with Willis we passed by Parker's Piece and there saw some forty Gownsmen playing at football. The novelty and liveliness of the scene were amusing!"

Rules of football

Parker's Piece has a special place in the history of modern football games, as it was here that several versions of the Cambridge Rules were first put into practice.  The 1863 Cambridge rules, advertised in sporting newspapers as newly created for a "game [that] will be played on Friday, 20 Nov, [1863] at 2:15 p.m. on Parker's Piece", played a significant role in the creation of the first laws of the Football Association published in December of that year.  A plaque has been mounted at Parker's Piece bearing the following inscription:

Modern passing tactics

The move by the Cambridge University AFC away from Parker's Piece in 1882 coincided with the side's significant role in the development of the modern passing, combination game. In a detailed investigation into the evolution of football tactics based upon contemporary accounts, Adrian Harvey refers to the teams responsible for the early development of the passing game (including Sheffield, The Royal Engineers and Queens Park) but comes to the following conclusion about the finished, modern team product:  "Curiously, the side that was generally credited with transforming the tactics of association football and almost single-handedly inventing the modern game was not a professional team but the Cambridge University XI of 1882.  Contemporaries described Cambridge as being the first "combination" team in which each player was allotted an area of the field and played as part of a team in a game that was based upon passing". In a discussion by C.W. Alcock on the history of a "definite scheme of attack" and "elaborate combination" in football playing style, he states in 1891:  "The perfection of the system which is in vogue at the present time however is in a very great measure the creation of the last few years.  The Cambridge University eleven of 1882 were the first to illustrate the full possibilities of a systematic combination giving full scope to the defence as well as the attack"

Proposed sculpture
In May 2013, the Cambridge City Council proposed that a  statue by artist Gordon Young, in the form of a Subbuteo referee on top of a circular plinth engraved with Cambridge Rules be installed on Parker's Piece to mark the 150th anniversary of the publication of the 1863 Football Association rules and Parker's Piece's association with it. The proposal was rejected in June 2013 before public consultation due to negative feedback and concerns with Hasbro, which markets Subbuteo, and the possibility of significantly exceeding its original £88,000 budget.

Trial lighting

For a four-week trial beginning January 2013, lighting bollards were temporarily installed along the northwest path, between Reality Checkpoint and Melbourne Place, as residents and students had claimed that Parker's Piece was unsafe after dark. Several attacks had previously occurred in the park.

Parkside
Parkside is the street on the north-east side of the park. Since 2006 it has been the terminus for long-distance coach services, visitor coaches and a stopping point for local bus services. The street is the location of the city's police and fire stations, and provides access to Parkside Community College.

Gallery

See also
 Christ's Pieces
 Jesus Green

References

Parks and open spaces in Cambridge
History of the University of Cambridge
Sport at the University of Cambridge
Cricket grounds in Cambridgeshire
History of football in England
Sports venues in Cambridge
Sports venues completed in 1817